"Mirándote" ("Looking At You") is a song written by Cheín García and performed by Puerto Rican salsa singer Frankie Ruiz on his 1994 studio album of the same name. AllMusic critic José. A Estévez cited the song as "one of his most popular ever". Héctor Reséndez of Cashbox noted that Ruiz "exploits his charismatic style" on the song. The track was recognized as one of the best-performing songs of the year at the 1996 ASCAP Latin Awards.

Charts

Year-end charts

See also
List of Billboard Tropical Airplay number ones of 1994 and 1995

References

1994 singles
1994 songs
Frankie Ruiz songs
Spanish-language songs